The Sri Lanka Transport Board (Sinhala: ශ්‍රී ලංකා ගමනාගමන මණ්ඩලය Shri Lanka Gamanāgamana Mandalaya)(formerly: Ceylon Transport Board, CTB) is a bus service provider in Sri Lanka.

Between 1958 and 1978, the Ceylon Transport Board (CTB) was the nationalised enterprise which handled all public bus transport in Sri Lanka. At its peak, it was the largest omnibus company in the world — with about 7,000 buses and over 50,000 employees. With privatization in 1979, it underwent a period of decline.

First broken up into several regional boards, then into several companies, it was finally reconstituted as the Sri Lanka Transport Board in 2005.

In 2016, the number of buses in the fleet was 7769, of which 6178 were in operation. In the same year, SLTB had a total of  32,640 employees.

History 

The first motor omnibus in Sri Lanka was imported in 1907 and bus transport began in Sri Lanka as an owner-operated service. There was no regulation, so when more than one bus operated on a single route, there was a scramble for the load. By the mid-1930s, malpractices in pursuit of maximum profit began to compromise safety and comfort. The setting up of the limited liability omnibus companies by the British around 1940 was the first meaningful step in regularising public passenger transport in the country.

The Ratnam Survey in 1948, the Sansoni Survey in 1954 and the Jayaratna Perera Survey in 1956 studied the bus services in Sri Lanka and all recommended that the companies should be nationalised.

The history of Sri Lanka Transport Board goes back to 1 January 1958; at the time known as the Ceylon Transport Board (CTB). The inaugural trip of the CTB took the Prime Minister and the Transport and Works Minister Maithripala Senanayake on a maroon luxury Mercedes-Benz bus imported from Germany. The bus is still owned by the Nittambuwa Bus Depot.

At its peak, it was the largest omnibus company in the world — with about 7,000 buses and over 50,000 employees. With privatization in 1979, it underwent a period of decline. The creation of a single nationalised entity made possible long-distance operations and running buses on a large number of rural routes.

First broken up into several regional boards, then into several companies, it was finally reconstituted as the Sri Lanka Transport Board in 2005.

The move received bipartisan support in Parliament. It was hailed by the Joint Business Forum (J-Biz), which welcomed the revival of the CTB: this was one of the rare occasions on which the business community said a state bus service was better than privatised ventures.

Services 

SLTB serves both urban and rural routes.  In many rural areas, it provides services in unprofitable areas that would be unattractive to private operators.

Urban routes 
Colombo has an extensive public transport system based on buses, some of which is operated by SLTB.  The Central Bus Stand in Pettah functions as the primary hub for bus transport in Colombo.

The road network in Colombo consists of radial links (or arterial routes), which link the city centre and district centres, and orbital links, which intersect the arterial routes; most bus routes run along the radial links without the benefit of dedicated bus lanes owing to the high volume of traffic at peak times.  A BRT system for Colombo has been proposed, but has yet to be implemented.

Normal Services

Most of the bus services covered by the SLTB are general services. These general services can be classified into two main categories.

That is,

1. Services with inter-provincial destinations

2. Services with internal provincial destinations.
1. Services with inter-provincial destinations.

1. Services with inter-provincial destinations.

 

Inter-provincial services are mainly concentrated in the commercial capital of Colombo. Secondly, it is mostly active in Kandy, Kurunegala and other district cities. In addition, more inter-provincial services are concentrated in several other suburbs such as Panadura, Kataragama and Maharagama.

   Inter-provincial bus services often start in one city and extend to another urban or rural destination. Most inter-provincial services are  Over 100 kms intercity or rural long distance services. However, inter-provincial services are also available along suburban and rural provincial boundaries with shorter destinations. 100 kms More than inter-provincial general services often run as limited stops. The SLTB has the longest inter-provincial service in Kataragama - Jaffna. The Kataragama (administrative boundary belongs to the Uva Province) depot in the Southern Province can also be pointed out as the only SLTB depot covering all the provinces of Sri Lanka.

2. Services with internal provincial destinations. 

Most of the internal provincial services are active in the Western, Southern, Northern, Eastern, North Western, Central, Uva, Sabaragamuwa and North Central Provinces.

The commercial capital of Colombo is mainly centered on the internal services of the Western Province. These include urban services that extend to other cities within the Colombo District, as well as medium-distance intercity services to other urban (rural) destinations in the province (Kalutara, Gampaha). Internal provincial services with the longest destinations operate in the Eastern Province and the Northern Province. Internal provincial long distance services also operate as limited stops.

Intercity routes 

SLTB also serves many intercity routes.  These routes connect many of the major population centres in the country.

As of January 2012, SLTB is the only bus operator on the Southern Expressway.  It uses modern Lanka Ashok Leyland buses on the expressway to connect Galle with Maharagama.  The buses operate every two hours.

As of 2013, the SLTB has started operating on the Katunayake Expressway providing access for people from Negombo, Katunayake, Puttalam, etc. to maintain access within 20 minutes.

Fleet 
Most of the fleet consists of buses from Ashok Leyland, Dennis, Volvo, Yutong, Tata, Mitsubishi and Isuzu.
The SLTB is currently expanding its fleet, by ordering new buses from Volvo.  The buses ordered have modern facilities, including low-floor design and air-conditioning.  In July 2011, trial runs began in Colombo to gauge passengers' response to the new buses.

Livery 
Most SLTB buses have a red livery and are easily recognisable.

Past liveries 
The CTB originally painted its buses red and blue. The second-hand London Transport buses, which were the backbone of the fleet, just needed to be half-painted in blue, saving on costs. When aluminium bus bodies became the norm, large areas of the surface were left unpainted, with just red front and back and blue strips down the side, in order to save money.

Logo 

The Logo was originally a blue oval with the words 'CTB' and the equivalents in Sinhala and Tamil painted on it in red. From 1970 this was replaced by an oval with a lion rampant or on field azure.

The present SLTB logo returns to the 1970s symbols, but with 'SLTB' instead of 'CTB' in Roman lettering, with 'Sri' added to the Sinhala script and no change in the Tamil script.

Transit Competitors 
SLTB buses compete with private buses throughout the country, as well as with rail services by Sri Lanka Railways.

Integration issues 
Sri Lanka Transport Board has not integrated its services with other modes of transport, such as rail.  Unlike transport systems in some other countries, Sri Lanka does not have a streamline ticket system between road and rail transport.  Buses do not provide dedicated feeder-bus services to the railways, resulting in commuter rail and buses acting as isolated systems in relation to each other, which creates a loss in efficiency.

See also 
Transport in Sri Lanka

References

Further reading 
Aryadasa Ratnasinghe, 'The development of bus transport in Sri Lanka', Daily News, 12 October 2004.
Chandra Edirisuriya, 'To mark landmark foreign participation in public transport in Sri Lanka : Annals of omnibus transport', Daily News, 18 December 2002.
Dinesh Gunawardena, ‘Anil Moonesinghe - a political and managerial visionary’, Daily News, 8 Dec 2005.
Editorial, 'Resurrecting the CTB', Sunday Observer, 27 March 2005.
Jayantha Sri Nissanka and Ranga Jayasuriya, 'Resurrection of the SLTB', Sunday Observer, 2 October 2005.
'Private buses and the CTB', LankaNewspapers.com, 2 October 2005.
R.W. Faulks, 'Sri Lanka transport history involved frequent change', BUSES INTERNATIONAL, August 2001.
Special Correspondent, 'Paving the way for resurrection of CTB', Sunday Observer, 3 April 2005.
'Sri Lanka Transport Board to raise the bus fleet', Colombo Page, 4 July 2007.
'Battling iron-eating rats in the CTB', The Island, 4 September 2008.

External links 
 
SLTB page at Ministry of Transport website
Pictures of decrepit British buses in CTB, RTB and 'peoplised' livery, post-1978
Classic Buses Profiles: PUBLIC TRANSPORT IN SRI LANKA, text and pictures

1958 establishments in Ceylon
Bus companies of Sri Lanka
Nationalised companies in Sri Lanka
State owned commercial corporations of Sri Lanka